Tenderness is the second studio album by Canadian electronic music duo Blue Hawaii. It was released on October 6, 2017, through Arbutus Records.

Track listing

References

2017 albums
Arbutus Records albums